Ben Geoghegan is a British journalist working for the BBC. He has  covered a wide variety of stories for most BBC News outlets in his previous role as a news correspondent based in the United Kingdom.

Education
Geoghegan was educated at Bradfield College, a boarding independent school in the village of Bradfield in Berkshire, followed by University College London, where he gained a bachelor's degree in Psychology, and the London College of Communication, where he obtained a diploma in Broadcast Journalism.

Life and career
Geoghegan has been with the BBC News Channel since it launched as BBC News 24 in 1997, and once presented the 0900-1300 shift on weekday mornings, initially alongside Jackie Hardgrave, now with BBC Radio Four, and then with Joanna Gosling, who is still a presenter with the channel. Since leaving the shift in 2001 he has continued to present occasional relief shifts, and in 2008 also presented some weekend editions of BBC Breakfast.

Geoghegan has also reported extensively for Newsnight. Geoghegan is currently working as a political correspondent for the BBC.

References

Year of birth missing (living people)
Living people
BBC newsreaders and journalists
People educated at Bradfield College
Alumni of University College London